Richard Augustus Tucker Steward (1 February 1773 – 25 March 1842) was an English politician who served as Member of Parliament for Weymouth and Melcombe Regis from 1806 to 1812.

References 

1773 births
1842 deaths
19th-century British politicians
Members of the Parliament of the United Kingdom for Weymouth and Melcombe Regis
Tory members of the Parliament of the United Kingdom
UK MPs 1806–1807
UK MPs 1807–1812